Hong Gil-dong (1440 – 1510?) was a Korean outlaw from the Joseon Dynasty.

Biography
Hong Gil-dong (洪吉同) was a Robin Hood-like Yangban born in the village of Achisil in Agok-ri, Jangseong County, Jeolla province. He was the illegitimate son (孽子) of Hong Sang-jik (洪尙直) and illegitimate grandson of Hong Jing (洪徵). Hong Gil-dong, in the Annals of the Joseon dynasty, was recorded to be born around the year 1443, or the 25th year of the reign of King Sejong (世宗 25年). During the tyrant's reign Yeonsan-gun, peasant armies rose throughout the country. One of the most well-known was the peasant army led by Hong Gil-dong. He, dressed as an aristocrat, attacked the government offices with many armed peasants. 

In 1500 (燕山 6年), he was captured for his robberies. He allegedly died around the year 1510, or the 5th year of the reign of King Jungjong (中宗 5年). 

Hong Gil-dong's name in Chinese characters (漢字) is 洪吉同, unlike the spelling in Heo Gyun's (許筠) fictional novel Tale of Hong Gildong (洪吉童傳), which is 洪吉童 of the same pronunciation.

In popular culture

Actors who have played Hong Gil-dong
 Portrayed by Kang Ji-hwan and Lee In-sung in the 2008 KBS2 TV series Hong Gil-dong.
 Portrayed by Sungmin and Yesung in the 2010 musical Hong Gil-dong.
 Portrayed by Yoon Kyun-sang in the 2017 MBC TV series The Rebel.
 Portrayed by Han Joo-wan in the 2015 Korean movie The Tale of the Bookworm.

References

External links
 The Story of Hong Gildong at WorldCat

1440 births
1510s deaths
Outlaws
15th-century Korean people
Hong Gildong jeon
People from Jangseong County